In Mesopotamian mythology, Zaqar or Dzakar is the messenger of the god Sin. He relays these messages to mortals through his power over their dreams and nightmares.

Mesopotamian gods
Messenger gods